The 1967 Long Beach State 49ers football team represented California State College, Long Beach—now known as California State University, Long Beach—as a member of the California Collegiate Athletic Association (CCAA) during the 1967 NCAA College Division football season. Led by tenth-year head coach Don Reed, the 49ers compiled an overall record of 5–5 with a mark of 3–2 in conference play, placing a three-way tie for second in the CCAA. The team played home games at Veterans Memorial Stadium adjacent to the campus of Long Beach City College in Long Beach, California.

Schedule

Team players in the NFL
The following were selected in the 1968 NFL Draft.

References

Long Beach State
Long Beach State 49ers football seasons
Long Beach State 49ers football